Puentemys is an extinct genus of bothremydid turtle from the Paleocene-age Cerrejón Formation in Colombia. Puentemys is the only Paleocene bothremydid known from South America, and is most closely related to the genus Foxemys from the Late Cretaceous of Europe, showing that Bothremydini, the tribe of bothremydids to which Puentemys belonged, had a nearly worldwide distribution across the K-T boundary. The ancestors of Puentemys may have reached South America by dispersing across Paleocene coastlines or by riding currents across the Atlantic Ocean.

References 

Bothremydidae
Paleocene turtles
Paleocene reptiles of South America
Itaboraian
Peligran
Paleogene Colombia
Fossils of Colombia
Cerrejón Formation
Fossil taxa described in 2012